Aarburg-Oftringen railway station is a railway station in the municipality of Aarburg, in the Swiss canton of Aargau. It is located at the junction of the standard gauge Olten–Bern and Olten–Lucerne lines of Swiss Federal Railways.

Services
The following services stop at Aarburg-Oftringen:

 Aargau S-Bahn:

References

External links 
 
 

Railway stations in the canton of Aargau
Swiss Federal Railways stations